Trifolium ciliolatum is a species of clover known by the common name foothill clover. It is native to western North America from Washington to Baja California.

It is a common plant of many regions, including disturbed habitat.

It is an annual herb growing erect in form, with hairless herbage. The leaves are made up of toothed oval leaflets and have bristle-tipped stipules. The inflorescence is a head of flowers 1 or 2 centimeters wide, the flowers often spreading out or drooping. The flower has a calyx of bristle-like sepals lined with hairs and a pinkish or purplish corolla.

Uses
The seeds and vegetation of this plant were a common food of many local Native American groups.

References

External links
Jepson Manual Treatment - Trifolium ciliolatum
Trifolium ciliolatum - Photo gallery

ciliolatum
Flora of Baja California
Flora of California
Flora of the West Coast of the United States
Flora of the Sierra Nevada (United States)
Natural history of the California chaparral and woodlands
Natural history of the Channel Islands of California
Natural history of the Peninsular Ranges
Natural history of the Santa Monica Mountains
Natural history of the Transverse Ranges
Plants used in Native American cuisine
Flora without expected TNC conservation status